Keith Smith (4 September 19172 June 2011) was an Australian broadcaster, radio and television personality, and writer.

Biography 
Edward Keith Smith was born in Melbourne in 1917.  He was taken out of school at age 13 as his parents could not afford to keep him there.  He went to work in a foundry, doing painful and exhausting work, before being offered an apprenticeship as a signwriter.  He started selling his comedy sketches to radio stations and appearing in radio plays for the ABC.  He served in New Guinea and the Solomon Islands during World War II.  On discharge in 1946 he moved to Sydney, where his career as an actor and writer took off.

Smith's most popular program was "The Pied Piper" (initially radio, later on television), in which he conducted candid interviews with children. He also devised and wrote (with veteran radio writer George Foster) the scripts for the 13 episodes of the television series "Mrs. Finnegan", which appeared on Sydney channel ATN 7 from 1970 to 1971.

He published the parenting book How to Get Closer to Your Children in 1985 and two volumes of Supernatural!: Australian Encounters in 1991 and 1993, about ghost sightings in Australia. He also wrote the social history work Australian Battlers Remember: The Great Depression, published in 2003.

Smith lived his last years as a recluse.  He died in Sydney on 2 June 2011, aged 93.

Writing 
The Bear with Bad Eyes; illustrated by Jiri Tibor Novak; Little Lilyfield, 1987
How to Get Closer to Your Children; Waratah Press, 1985
The Migrant Mouse; illustrated by Bruno Jean Grasswill; Little Lilyfield, 1988
The Palace of Signs : Memories of Hard Times and High Times in the Great Depression; Sun, 1991
World War II wasn't All Hell; Hutchinson Australia, 1988
The Pig that was Different; illustrated by Mary Ferguson; Bow Press in association with Hutchinson Australia, 1988
Keith Smith's Riddle Book from Outer Space; Rigby, c. 1964
A Word from Children; Rigby, 1960
Ogf: Being the Private Papers of George Cockburn, Bus Conductor, a Resident of Hurstfield, a Suburb of Sydney, Australia; Ure Smith, 1965
Australian Battlers Remember: the Great Depression; Random House, c. 2003
The Pied Piper: Keith Smith's Riddle Book for Children; Rigby, 1960
T.V. Jokes for Children; Rigby, 1972
T.V. Jokes for Children 2; Rigby, 1972
Keith Smith's T-V Picture Puzzle Book. No. 1; Rigby, 1973
Keith Smith's T-V Picture Puzzle Book. No. 2; Rigby, 1973
Keith Smith's Dum Dora Jokes, illustrations by Eva Wickenberg; Rigby, 1977
TV Cook Book for Kids; Rigby, 1972
Keith Smith's Knock! Knock! Jokes; illustrations by Eva Wickenberg; Rigby, 1977
Keith Smith's Riddle Round Up; illustrations by Eva Wickenberg; Rigby, 1977
Supernatural!: Australian Encounters; Pan, 1991
Supernatural No. 2: More Australian Encounters; Pan MacMillan, 1993
The Time of their Lives!: Remembering Yesterday's Australia; Allen & Unwin, 1993

References

External links
Keith Smith Austlit (18 December 2007). Retrieved 12 August 2008.
Interview with Keith Smith - The Pied Piper, "Remember When" (radio program), 3AW (Melbourne), 28 March 1993. Interviewed by Bruce Mansfield and Philip Brady. Includes some recorded excerpts from Smith's "Pied Piper" program. Retrieved on 1 May 2017.

1917 births
2011 deaths
Australian children's writers
ABC radio (Australia) journalists and presenters
Australian television presenters
3AW presenters
Writers from Melbourne
Television personalities from Melbourne